The 2022 AFF U-23 Championship was the 3rd edition of the AFF U-23 Championship, organised by ASEAN Football Federation (AFF). The tournament was held from 14 to 26 February in Phnom Penh, Cambodia. Indonesia were the defending champions, having won the 2019 edition. The tournament was held amidst the COVID-19 pandemic. Indonesia and Myanmar withdrew from the tournament after several of their players tested positive for COVID-19.

Vietnam won the tournament for the first time after beating Thailand 1–0 in the final.

Qualified teams 
There was no qualification, and all entrants advanced to the final tournament. The following teams from member associations of the AFF entered the tournament:

Draw 
The draw for the 2022 AFF U-23 Championship was held on 29 December 2021 at the Goodwood Park Hotel in Singapore.

Squads 

A final squad of 23 players (three of whom must be goalkeepers) must be registered one day before the first match of the tournament.

Match officials
 Zulfiqar Mustaffa
 Khoun Virak
 Abdul Hakim Mohd Haidi
 Yudi Nurcahya
 Souei Vongkham
 Tuan Yaasin Hanafiah
 Warintorn Sassadee
 Ngô Duy Lân

Venues

Group stage 
All times are local, ICT (UTC+7).

Group A

Group B 
After the withdrawal of Indonesia and Myanmar from the tournament, due to several of their players testing positive for COVID-19, the two remaining teams will play against each other twice. The winners will qualify for the knockout stage, while the losers will be eliminated.

Group C

Ranking of second-placed teams
Only one second-placed team will qualify for the semi finals.

Due to Indonesia and Myanmar's withdrawals, Group B is left with only two teams. Thus, the second-placed team from Group B will not be included to determine the best runner-up team.

Result against fourth-placed team in Group A was not considered for this ranking.

Knockout stage 
In the knockout stage, the penalty shoot-out was used to decide the winner if necessary.

Bracket

Semi-finals

Third place match

Final

Statistics

Winners

Awards

Goalscorers

Final ranking
This table will show the ranking of teams throughout the tournament.

Broadcasting rights

Notes

References

External links 
 

2019
2022 in AFF football
2022 in youth association football
2022 in Asian football
International association football competitions hosted by Cambodia
AFF